Virginia's 9th Senate district is one of 40 districts in the Senate of Virginia. It is an open seat pending a special election to replace Democrat Jennifer McClellan who was elected to the United States House of Representatives. It is currently the most Democratic-leaning district in the Virginia Senate.

Geography
District 9 is based primarily in the City of Richmond, stretching to also include all of Charles City County and parts of Hanover County and Henrico County.

The district overlaps with Virginia's 1st, 4th, and 7th congressional districts, and with the 55th, 68th, 69th, 70th, 71st, 72nd, 73rd, and 74th districts of the Virginia House of Delegates.

Recent election results

2023 special election
Following Jennifer McClellan's February 2023 election to Congress, a special election was called for the district. Lamont Bagby is the Democratic nominee.

2019

2017 special

2015

2011

Federal and statewide results in District 9

Historical results
All election results below took place prior to 2011 redistricting, and thus were under different district lines.

2007

2003

1999

1995

District officeholders since 1940

References

Virginia Senate districts
Richmond, Virginia
Government in Henrico County, Virginia
Hanover County, Virginia
Charles City County, Virginia